The Super Bowl LVII halftime show, officially known as the Apple Music Super Bowl LVII Halftime Show, was the halftime entertainment of Super Bowl LVII, which took place on February 12, 2023, at State Farm Stadium in Glendale, Arizona. It featured Barbadian singer Rihanna as the headline performer. It was televised nationally in the U.S. by Fox, Fox Deportes, and the Fox Sports and NFL apps, and was the first Super Bowl halftime show to be sponsored by Apple Music.

Background and overview 
In October 2019, Barbadian singer Rihanna revealed to Vogue that she had turned down an offer from the National Football League (NFL) to perform at the Super Bowl LIII halftime show in solidarity with Colin Kaepernick. In 2016, Kaepernick knelt during the national anthem at the start of NFL games in protest of police brutality and racial inequality in the United States. He later filed a grievance against the NFL and its owners in November 2017, accusing them of colluding to keep him out of the league. Kaepernick withdrew the grievance in February 2019, ahead of Super Bowl LIII, after reaching a confidential settlement with the NFL.

On September 22, 2022, the NFL announced that the new naming rights sponsor for the Super Bowl halftime show would be Apple Music starting with Super Bowl LVII, replacing sponsor Pepsi, which had sponsored the previous ten halftime shows. Some media reports alleged on social media that American singer-songwriter Taylor Swift would be the headlining performer, based on her associations with Apple and traditional Pepsi rival, Coca-Cola. Subsequently, various outlets reported that Swift had turned down the offer, claiming that she would not do the halftime show until her re-recording process was complete; other sources said that Swift had never been scheduled in the slot.

On September 25, 2022, the NFL announced that Rihanna would headline the halftime show. The performance would be Rihanna's first live performance in five years since appearing at the 60th Annual Grammy Awards in 2018. In an interview with Apple Music's Nadeska Alexis, several days before the halftime show, Rihanna said she was on the 39th version of the show's set list. In the days leading up to the halftime show, Rihanna teased in an interview with Nate Burleson that she might bring out a "surprise" guest. It was confirmed following the show that she was pregnant with her second child.

Reception 
Chris Richards of The Washington Post believed Rihanna "made the biggest show of her life look easy. Rating it 5 stars out of five, Mark Beaumont of The Independent called the gig "a roaring success". Jason Lamphier of Entertainment Weekly called it a "low-stakes return" for Rihanna, offering a "slick, chic, serviceable survey of some of pop's best offerings of the past two decades." The Daily Beast Coleman Spilde argued "Rihanna's performance may not have had the same level of spectacle as her peers, but it was distinctly Rihanna. She let the world move around her, showing off decades of power and influence like she was simply clocking into work." Rolling Stone Rob Sheffield praised Rihanna for "being a boss and a half on her flying stage, reigning supreme" without any guests or surprises. However, he wrote that "two consecutive Kanye songs", "All of the Lights" and "Run This Town" felt "mighty strange". The Athletic ranked it as the third best halftime show ever, while Rolling Stone ranked it the eighth.

The San Diego Union-Tribune George Varga opined that the show was "more a triumph of choreography" than music, adding that "Rihanna crammed so many songs — make that, parts of songs — into her set that few of them had a chance to breathe, let alone gain traction and take flight." At NJ.com, Bobby Olivier criticized some of the setlist choices and felt Rihanna lacked showmanship, opining that "this halftime show will go down as one of the lamest offerings in recent memory."

Commercial impact 
Rihanna's performance attained a total of 118.7 million viewers across TV and digital platforms, overtaking the Super Bowl LI halftime show (2017) to become the second-most-watched halftime show in history, behind the Super Bowl XLIX halftime show (2015).

Following the performance, Billboard reported that Rihanna's song catalog received a leap of 140% across all on-demand streaming services in the US. On February 12–13, her songs received 62.2 million on-demand official streams nationwide. Sales-wise, she sold 42,000 downloads in the US during those two days. "Umbrella" and "Diamonds" were Rihanna's most streamed songs following the performance, with 3.8 million and 3.2 million streams on February 12–13 respectively. In the week ending February 16, Luminate reported that Rihanna had earned 166.13 million on-demand streams in the US across her full song catalog. In doing so, she has received her best streaming week in the country ever. As a result of that, several of her songs re-entered the US Billboard Hot 100 chart, including "Umbrella" at number 37, "Diamonds" at number 44, and "We Found Love" charted at number 48. 

The same week, Rihanna's studio albums sold a total of 142,000 album-equivalent units in the country. For the week dated February 25, five of Rihanna's albums charted within the top 50 of the US Billboard 200 chart. Anti (2016) charted at number eight and managed to earn 36,000 equivalent albums in the country, 166% up, according to Luminate. Furthermore, Good Girl Gone Bad (2007) charted at number 15, Unapologetic (2012) at number 18, Loud (2010) at number 26, and Talk That Talk (2011) at number 49. With this feat, Rihanna became only the seventh act to place at least five albums in the top 50 on the Billboard 200 in the last 50 years.

In the week following the performance, Rihanna's albums Good Girl Gone Bad and Anti re-entered the top 50 of the Australian Albums Chart at number 32 and 35, respectively. The same week, both of the albums also re-entered the UK Albums Chart; Anti at number 39 and Good Girl Gone Bad at number 42. Additionally, Loud charted at number 81. On the Norwegian Albums Chart four of Rihanna's albums charted within the top 40 that same week, including Anti at number 19, Unapologetic at number 27, Good Girl Gone Bad: Reloaded (2008) at number 36 and Loud at number 40.

Set list 

 "What's My Name?" (Intro)
 "Bitch Better Have My Money" (contains elements of "Phresh Out the Runway")
 "Where Have You Been" (contains elements of "Cockiness (Love It)")
 "Only Girl (In the World)"
 "We Found Love" (contains elements of "S&M")
 "Rude Boy" (DJ Klean remix; contains elements of "Kiss It Better")
 "Work"
 "Wild Thoughts" 
 "Pour It Up" (contains elements of "Birthday Cake" and "Numb")
 "All of the Lights" (contains elements of "Pose")
 "Run This Town"
 "Umbrella"
 "Diamonds"

Setlist adapted from Today and Bustle.

References 

2023 in American music
2023 in American television
2023 in Arizona
February 2023 events in the United States
Rihanna
057
Television shows directed by Hamish Hamilton (director)